Batang West Side (also known as West Side Avenue and West Side Kid) is a 2001 Philippine crime film. The film written and directed by Lav Diaz. Its cast includes Gloria Diaz, Raul Arellano, Joel Torre and Angel Aquino. The film gives an inside look at the life of Filipinos in America. With this murder mystery set against the idea of the American Dream, Filipino director Lav Diaz broke into the worldwide arthouse film market.

Cast 
 Yul Servo as Hanzel Harana
 Joel Torre as Juan Mijares
 Gloria Diaz as Lolita Fordham
 Angel Aquino as Elvira Pareño

Accolades 
The film won several awards at the Urian Honors, including Best Picture, Best Director (Lav Diaz), Best Screenplay (Lav Diaz), Best Cinematography, Best Actor (Joel Torre), Best Supporting Actress (Gloria Diaz), Best Supporting Actor, Best Production Design, Best Sound, and Best Score (Joey Ayala). It won Best Picture at the Singapore International Film Festival and the Belgium Independent Film Festival.

See also 
 List of longest films

References

External links 
 

2001 films
2000s crime drama films
Philippine coming-of-age films
Philippine coming-of-age drama films
Philippine crime films
Philippine drama films
Filipino-language films
2000s Tagalog-language films
Films set in New Jersey
Films shot in New Jersey
2000s English-language films
Films directed by Lav Diaz